Larry Pacifico (born January 17, 1946) is an American former world champion powerlifter.

Larry won nine straight IPF World Powerlifting Championships from 1971–1979. Larry won a total of 102 competitions and set 54 World Records during his powerlifting career.

Larry is widely regarded as one of the greatest powerlifters of all time, and goes by the nickname "Mr. Powerlifting".

Three-time World's Strongest Man winner and two-time IPF world champion Bill Kazmaier once stated, "The first time I went to a powerlifting meet and saw Larry, I think he was probably six or seven on his World Championships and he was pretty much—how would you say?—a god in powerlifting. He could go to any class that he wanted to. He could pretty much lift whatever weight on the day he wanted to." Four-time IPF powerlifting champion and 1979 World's Strongest Man winner Don Reinhoudt said of Larry, "I look at Larry, an idol to all of us here—nine time champion and Larry will always be the legend of all time to us."

Larry was inducted into the York Barbell Hall of Fame on June 28, 1998. Larry currently owns his own gym and is a personal trainer in Dayton, Ohio.

Best competition lifts 
Squat : 832 pounds
Bench press : 592 pounds (no bench shirt)
Deadlift : 771 pounds
Total : 2,061 pounds

Best exhibition lifts 
Squat : 885 pounds
Bench press : 611 pounds
Deadlift : 815 pounds
Push press : 440 pounds
Standing press : 315 pounds in 1968
Snatch: 270 pounds in 1968
Clean and Jerk : 320 pounds in 1968

References 

American powerlifters
American strength athletes
1946 births
Living people